Union Falls is a fan-type waterfall on Mountain Ash Creek, a tributary of the Fall River in the Cascade Corner (southwest) of Yellowstone National Park, in Wyoming, United States. The falls was named by members of the Arnold Hague Geological Surveys sometime between 1884 and 1886. Geologist J.P. Iddings claims the name derives from the fact that a tributary of Mountain Ash Creek joins at the very brink of the falls, thus Union Falls. Access to the falls is via the Mountain Ash Creek trail and the Grassy Lake Road.

Notes

Waterfalls of Teton County, Wyoming
Waterfalls of Wyoming
Waterfalls of Yellowstone National Park
Fan waterfalls